Patteeswaram is a village, eight kilometres from Kumbakonam in the state of Tamil Nadu in India.  The village was named after Patti (also called Nandini), the calf of Kamadhenu, the divine cow in Hindu mythology. It is the suburban region of Kumbakonam city in Thanjavur district.

Patteswaram village

Temples
The village is famous for two temples:
 Thenupuriswarar Temple
 Lord Sakthivanesvara Temple
 Saliyamaharishi bajanai Madam

Another Important Temple is also there :
 Kothanda Ramar Temple

Marriage halls
A.G.R Thirumana Mahal 
Thiruvalluvar Thirumana Arangam

References
 District Development Authority,Thanjavur

External links

Utthiramerur - Town with inscriptions about Cholas internal administration and election process

Villages in Thanjavur district